Dorcadion theophilei is a species of beetle in the family Cerambycidae. It was described by Pic in 1898. It is known from Turkey.

References

theophilei
Beetles described in 1898